The Academy of Motion Picture Arts and Sciences has given Academy Awards to actors and actresses for their performances in films since its inception. Throughout the history of the Academy Awards, there have been actors and actresses who have received multiple Academy Awards for Best Actor, Best Actress, Best Supporting Actor, or Best Supporting Actress. The only restriction is that actors cannot receive multiple nominations for the same performance. This rule was implemented after Barry Fitzgerald received a Best Actor and a Best Supporting Actor nomination for his performance in Going My Way.

, 44 actors and actresses have received two or more Academy Awards in acting categories. Katharine Hepburn leads the way with four (all Best Actress). Six have won exactly three acting Academy Awards:  Daniel Day-Lewis (three Best Actor awards), Frances McDormand (three Best Actress awards), Meryl Streep (two Best Actress awards and one Best Supporting Actress award), Jack Nicholson (two Best Actor awards and one Best Supporting Actor award), Ingrid Bergman (two Best Actress awards and one Best Supporting Actress award), and Walter Brennan (three Best Supporting Actor awards). Brennan became the first to receive three or more Academy Awards (winning the third for a 1940 film), followed by Hepburn (1968), Bergman (1974), Nicholson (1997), Streep (2011), Day-Lewis (2012), and, most recently, McDormand (2020). Of the seven, only Nicholson, Streep, McDormand, and Day-Lewis are still living.

While there is no restriction on a performer winning the Best Actor/Actress and Best Supporting Actor/Actress awards in the same year for two roles in two movies, this has yet to happen—although there have been occasions where performers have been nominated for both in the same year.

List
 † = deceased

See also 

 List of actors with two or more Academy Award nominations in acting categories
 List of actors nominated for Academy Awards for foreign language performances
 List of Academy Award records

References

External links
 The Official Academy Awards Database
 
 IMDb Academy Awards Page

Lists of Academy Award winners
Academy Awards